Progress M-03M, identified by NASA as Progress 35P, was a Progress spacecraft used by the Russian Federal Space Agency to resupply the International Space Station (ISS).

Launch
Progress M-03M launched on a Soyuz-U carrier rocket, flying from Site 1/5 at the Baikonur Cosmodrome. Liftoff took place at 01:14 UTC on 15 October 2009.

Docking
Docking with the Pirs module of the ISS took place on 18 October 2009 at 01:40 UTC.

Cargo
Progress M-03M delivered 790 kg (1750 lb) of dry cargo, 870 kg (1918 lb) of propellant and 420 kg (926 lb) of water.

Undocking

The spacecraft undocked from Pirs on 22 April 2010. Filled with trash and discarded space station items, the Progress ship was used for scientific experiments until it was deorbited, entering the Earth's atmosphere and burning up over the Pacific Ocean. The deorbit burn occurred at 18:07 UTC on 27 April 2010.

See also

 List of Progress flights
 Uncrewed spaceflights to the International Space Station

References

External links
 http://www.nasa.gov/mission_pages/station/structure/iss_manifest.html

Spacecraft launched in 2009
Progress (spacecraft) missions
Spacecraft which reentered in 2010
Supply vehicles for the International Space Station
Spacecraft launched by Soyuz-U rockets